Chesias rhegmatica is a moth of the family Geometridae. It was described by Prout in 1937. It is endemic to Cyprus.

References

rhegmatica
Endemic fauna of Cyprus
Invertebrates of Cyprus
Moths of Asia
Moths described in 1937
Taxa named by Louis Beethoven Prout